Cornwall railway station is located at the north end of Station Road, east of Pitt Street in the north end of the city of Cornwall, Ontario, Canada.

The station is wheelchair accessible but advance notice has to be given. In 2013, the ticket counter was replaced by a self-service kiosk.

The station is served by Cornwall Transit Route 1.

Railway services

As of early May 2020, Cornwall station is served by one domestic route (with connections). Departures have been reduced to one per day in either direction due to the coronavirus pandemic (effective March 31, 2020).

History

The Canadian National Railway line was relocated to a more northerly route in 1957 due to construction of the Saint Lawrence Seaway. The Grand Trunk Railway and station originally came to Cornwall in 1856 and the stone CNR station building in downtown was torn down in 1962.

References

External links

Via Rail stations in Ontario
Buildings and structures in Cornwall, Ontario
Rail transport in Cornwall, Ontario
Canadian National Railway stations in Ontario